McGuire is an unincorporated community in Dunklin County, in the U.S. state of Missouri.

History
A post office called McGuire was established in 1905, and remained in operation until 1914. The community has the name of Fred McGuire, original owner of the site.

References

Unincorporated communities in Dunklin County, Missouri
Unincorporated communities in Missouri